A list of films produced in Russia in 2020 (see 2020 in film).

Film releases

Cultural Russian films
 Lost in Russia is a 2020 Chinese comedy film.
 Tenet is a 2020 science fiction action-thriller film directed by Christopher Nolan.

See also 
 2020 in film
 2020 in Russia

References

External links 

2020
Films
Lists of 2020 films by country or language